The 2008 Wells earthquake occurred at 07:16:02 on February 21, 2008 just northeast of the town of Wells, Nevada, United States, causing moderate damage, mainly to older brick buildings.  The quake was centered on one of the faults of the Independence Valley fault system, about nine kilometers (5.6 miles) beneath the surface and had no known near-surface offset.

See also

List of earthquakes in 2008
List of earthquakes in Nevada
List of earthquakes in the United States

References

Earthquakes in Nevada
Earthquakes in Utah